Moldova competed in the 2008 Summer Olympics. Moldova won one medal at the games, a bronze for boxer bantamweight Veaceslav Gojan.

Medalists

Athletics

Men
Track & road events

Field events

Combined events – Decathlon

Women
Track & road events

Field events

Boxing

Moldova qualified two boxers for the Olympic boxing tournament. Grusac was the first, qualifying at the World Championships. Gojan was the second, qualifying at the first European qualifier.

Cycling

Road

Track
Pursuit

Judo

Shooting 

Men

Swimming

Men

Women

Weightlifting

Wrestling

Men's freestyle

Women's freestyle

References

Nations at the 2008 Summer Olympics
2008
Summer Olympics